Livedrive is an online cloud backup and sync storage service owned by j2 Global. The company provides users with unlimited backup space and 2,000 GB or more of sync storage. Livedrive enables users to access their data from mobile phones and tablets. Currently Livedrive has apps for iOS, Android, Windows, macOS and ChromeOS.

History 
Livedrive was founded in late 2008 by Andrew Michael. Another investor in the company was Nicholas Cowell.

In October 2009 Livedrive entered into the US market place via a distribution agreement with Lifeboat Distribution - an international speciality software distribution for security, application lifecycle, and virtualization and network infrastructure products.

In April 2011, Livedrive created an April fools video which falsely stated that the company was storing files on paper using QR codes. The story was picked up by several press sources as a true story including CBS's Money Watch.

On February 10, 2014, Livedrive was purchased by j2 Global. Livedrive is part of j2's Business Cloud Services division, which includes eFax, eVoice, Fusemail, Campaigner, and KeepITsafe.

After shutting down hundreds of user accounts for “excessive bandwidth/storage”, Livedrive was reported in August 2014 to be facing legal action from discontented customers.

Media streaming
In  September 2010, Livedrive added personal music and movie streaming to their accounts. This gave users the ability to listen to their own music collections or watch their movies on a remote computer, with transcoding handled by Livedrive. The company also gave users FTP access and unlimited versioning.

References 

Cloud applications
Data synchronization
Email attachment replacements
File hosting
File sharing services
Online backup services
Internet properties established in 2008
File hosting for macOS
File hosting for Windows